The Niels Bohr International Gold Medal is an international engineering award. It has been awarded since 1955 for "outstanding work by an engineer or physicist for the peaceful utilization of atomic energy". The medal is administered by the Danish Society of Engineers (Denmark) in collaboration with the Niels Bohr Institute and the Royal Danish Academy of Sciences. It was awarded 10 times between 1955 and 1982 and again in 2013. The first recipient was Niels Bohr himself who received the medal in connection with his 70th birthday.

2013 laureate 

Alain Aspect, regarded as an outstanding figure in optical and atomic physics, was awarded the medal for his experiments on the Bell's inequalities test. It was presented on 7 October 2013 by Queen Margrethe and Prince Henrik at a special event at the Honorary Residence in the Carlsberg Academy.

Recipients
The following scientists have been awarded the Niels Bohr Medal:

Niels Bohr, 1955
John Cockcroft, 1958
George de Hevesy, 1961 
Pyotr Kapitsa, 1965
Isidor Isaac Rabi, 1967
Werner Karl Heisenberg, 1970
Richard P. Feynman, 1973
Hans A. Bethe, 1976
Charles H. Townes, 1979
John Archibald Wheeler, 1982
Alain Aspect, 2013
Jens Nørskov, 2018
Ewine van Dishoeck, 2022

See also
 UNESCO Niels Bohr Medal
 List of engineering awards
 List of physics awards

References

Awards established in 1955
Danish science and technology awards
Physics awards
1955 establishments in Denmark